Hodmedod may refer to:
 Scarecrow (Berkshire dialect term)
 Hodmedod's, formal name Hodmedod Ltd, British food retailer and producer